The list of members of the National Assembly of Hungary (2018–2022) is the list of members of the National Assembly – the unicameral legislative body of Hungary – according to the outcome of the Hungarian parliamentary election of 2018.

Officials

Speaker
 László Kövér (Fidesz)

First Officer
 Márta Mátrai (Fidesz)

Deputy Speaker for Legislation
 Csaba Hende (Fidesz)

Deputy Speakers
 Koloman Brenner (Jobbik) (July 3, 2020 – May 1, 2022)
 István Hiller (MSZP)
 István Jakab (Fidesz)
 János Latorcai (KDNP)
 Sándor Lezsák (Fidesz)
 Tamás Sneider (Jobbik) (May 8, 2018 – May 27, 2020)

Recorders

 András Aradszki (KDNP) (June 29, 2020 – May 1, 2022)
 Gergely Arató (DK)
 Sándor Bodó (Fidesz) (May 8, 2018 – June 12, 2018)
 László Földi (KDNP)
 Attila Gelencsér (Fidesz)
 Csaba Gyüre (Jobbik) (June 29, 2020 – May 1, 2022)
 Dezső Hiszékeny (MSZP)
 László György Lukács (Jobbik) (February 18, 2019 – May 1, 2022)
 József Attila Móring (KDNP)
 István Simicskó (KDNP) (June 4, 2018 – June 29, 2020)

 Ádám Steinmetz (Jobbik) (June 29, 2020 – May 1, 2022)
 Sándor Szabó (MSZP)
 István Szávay (Jobbik) (May 8, 2018 – December 10, 2018)
 György Szilágyi (Jobbik) (May 8, 2018 – June 4, 2020)
 Lajos Szűcs (Fidesz)
 István Tiba (Fidesz)
 Bence Tordai (PM)
 László Varga (MSZP)
 Győző Vinnai (Fidesz) (July 2, 2018 – May 1, 2022)

Father of the House
 Béla Turi-Kovács (Fidesz) (age 82 in 2018)

Baby of the House
 Péter Ungár (LMP) (age 26 in 2018)

Senior Recorders
 Tibor Bana (Jobbik) (age 32 in 2018)
 Attila Barcza (Fidesz) (age 33 in 2018)
 Anett Bősz (PM) (age 31 in 2018)
 Dóra Dúró (Jobbik) (age 31 in 2018)
 Gergely Farkas (Jobbik) (age 31 in 2018)
 Lőrinc Nacsa (KDNP) (age 28 in 2018)
 János Stummer (Jobbik) (age 33 in 2018)

Leaders of the parliamentary groups
Fidesz: Máté Kocsis
Jobbik:
Márton Gyöngyösi (May 8, 2018 – June 24, 2019)
Péter Jakab (June 25, 2019 – May 1, 2022)
KDNP:
Péter Harrach (May 8, 2018 – July 14, 2020)
István Simicskó (July 15, 2020 – May 1, 2022)
MSZP: Bertalan Tóth
DK: Ferenc Gyurcsány
LMP:
Bernadett Szél (May 8, 2018 – September 15, 2018)
László Lóránt Keresztes (September 16, 2018 – May 1, 2022)
PM: Tímea Szabó

Composition

Members of the National Assembly

By name

Nationality delegates 

Every nationality which is recognized in Hungary can elect a delegate (if the quota for full representation was not achieved) who has no voting rights in the Assembly.

See also

 Fourth Orbán Government
 List of Hungarian people

References

External links 
Official website of Hungarian National Assembly in Hungarian and English
Informative data on the composition of the National Assembly valasztas.hu
Politics.hu - English-language resource about Hungarian politics

2018
 
2018 establishments in Hungary
2022 disestablishments in Hungary